Clint Gresham (born August 24, 1986) is a former American football long snapper.

Early life
Clint Gresham was born to Jim Gresham and Martha Booe on August 24, 1986. Gresham attended W.B. Ray High School in Corpus Christi, Texas until his graduation in 2005.

College career
He attended the University of Oklahoma, as a preferred walk-on, but ultimately transferred to TCU, graduating in 2009. While at TCU, Gresham majored in entrepreneurial management with a minor in communications.

Professional career
Gresham was the only long snapper invited to the 2010 NFL Draft. However, he was not selected in the draft, and signed as an undrafted free agent for the 2010 season by the New Orleans Saints, Gresham was picked up on waivers by the Seattle Seahawks on August 1, 2010. On March 20, 2015, he re-signed with the Seahawks on a three-year contract worth $2.7 million total and a $300,000 signing bonus. He was released by the Seahawks on March 16, 2016.

Post NFL Career 
Gresham is an author and speaker in Dallas, Texas. His latest book is called "Becoming: Loving the Process to Wholeness" and is self-described as a roadmap for personal growth and learning who you are.

Personal life
Gresham is a Christian, and a Young Life leader.

Gresham's father, Jim, played football at Texas from 1974–76. His cousin, Phil Pratt, played football at Oklahoma in the 1960s.

In March 2015, Gresham married Matti Gresham (née Schumacher). The two have a young daughter and son (due in January 2021).

References

External links
Seattle Seahawks bio 
CBSSports.com

1986 births
Living people
Sportspeople from Corpus Christi, Texas
Players of American football from Texas
American football long snappers
TCU Horned Frogs football players
New Orleans Saints players
Seattle Seahawks players